Macduff's son is a character in William Shakespeare's tragedy Macbeth (1606). His name and age are not established in the text; however, he is estimated to be 7–10 years of age. He is Shakespeare's typical child character—cute and clever. While Lady Macduff and her children are mentioned in Holinshed's Chronicles as the innocent victims of Macbeth's cruelty, Shakespeare is completely responsible for developing Macduff's son as a character.

The boy appears in only one scene (4.2), in which he briefly banters with his mother and is then murdered by Macbeth's thugs. The scene's purpose is twofold: it provides Shakespeare's audience with a thrillingly horrific moment, and it underscores the depravity into which Macbeth has fallen. The brutal scene has often been cut in modern performance.

Macduff's son is viewed as a symbol of the youthful innocence Macbeth hates and fears, and the scene has been compared by one critic to the biblical Massacre of the Innocents. He is described as an "egg" by his murderer, further emphasising on his youth before his imminent death.

Role in the play 
In 4.2, Lady Macduff bewails her husband's desertion of home and family, then falsely tells her son that his father is dead. The boy does not believe her and says that if his father were really dead, she'd cry for him, and if she didn't then it would "be a good sign that I should quickly have a new father." Macbeth's henchmen arrive, and, when they declare Macduff a traitor, the boy leaps forward to defend his absent father. One of the henchmen stabs the boy who cries to his mother as he dies, "Run away, I pray you!". This highlights the loyalty, affection and love which make up this character.

Cuts in performance 
The on-stage slaughter of Macduff's son was often cut in 19th-century performances on the grounds of taste.  The child was carried off-stage, and the murder left to the spectators' imaginations.  Very often, the entire scene was cut, not only on the grounds of taste but, in an age of elaborate scenery and lengthy scene shifting, on time constraints and production costs in mounting a superfluous scene verbally summarised to good effect almost immediately in 4.3.

Analysis 
Samuel Taylor Coleridge commented:This scene, dreadful as it is, is still a relief, because a variety, because domestic, and therefore soothing, as associated with the only real pleasures of life. The conversation between Lady Macduff's and her child heightens the pathos, and is preparatory for the deep tragedy of their assassination. Shakspeare's fondness for children is every where shown;—in Prince Arthur, in King John; in the sweet scene in the Winter's Tale between Hermione and her son; nay, even in honest Evans's examination of Mrs. Page's schoolboy.

To the objection that Shakspeare wounds the moral sense by the unsubdued, undisguised description of the most hateful atrocity—that he tears the feelings without mercy, and even outrages the eye itself with scenes of insupportable horror—I, omitting Titus Andronicus, as not genuine, and excepting the scene of Gloster's blinding in Lear, answer boldly in the name of Shakspeare, not guilty.

The murderer cries as he stabs the boy, "What, you egg! ... Young fry of treachery!" This hints at the reason Macbeth is so eager to have him killed. Macbeth, seeing that, as the Three Witches foretold, he is destined to be king with no offspring to inherit his throne, is determined to kill the offspring of others, including Fleance and Macduff's son.

The tension that exists between Fleance, Banquo's son, and Macbeth would be made stronger by the existence of a child of Macbeth, should he be portrayed as having one—whether his own natural son, or adopted. As Lady Macbeth says "I have given suck, and know / How tender 'tis to love the babe that milks me". Seeing Macbeth in a fatherly perspective produces a combination of both tender and ambitious fatherliness in him. All that Macbeth does to others' sons in the play, then, is for his own heir. (Lady Macbeth, at least, has had a child, but no actual son of Macbeth is mentioned in the play—the "babe" may have been a girl, or died young, or—more likely—been a reference to his historical stepson Lulach, from Lady Macbeth's previous marriage, Macbeth's heir but not his own son.) Some productions show this tenderness by having Macbeth frequently pat Fleance on the head, or attempt to do so, but be denied it when Fleance withdraws to his father. This rivalry between groups of fathers and sons (Banquo and Fleance, Macduff and his son, Macbeth and his lack of a son) is seen as an important theme of the play.

One scholar views the scene as parallel to the Massacre of the Innocents, in which Herod had the children of Bethlehem killed to protect his throne. The boy's innocent image is strengthened by his mother calling him "poor monkey" and a "prattler".

Throughout the play, Macbeth is concerned with controlling the future. Since children are symbolic of the future, they represent his biggest threat. Macduff's son, in his bold denunciation of the murderers, is a strong symbol of the danger Macbeth faces. Paradoxically, the more Macbeth tries to rid himself of the human emotions (compassion, love) that lead to children, the less capable he is of meeting this threat and controlling his future.

Performances 
Orson Welles' daughter, Christopher, played the role of Macduff's son in her father's controversial 1948 film adaptation of the play.

In PBS's Great Performances Series' TV movie of Macbeth with Patrick Stewart as Macbeth set in a nameless 20th-century militaristic society, Macduff's son is played by Hugo Docking.

References

External links 
Macbeth: Folio Version
Macbeth: Full-text online

Literary characters introduced in 1603
Male Shakespearean characters
Child characters in film
Characters in Macbeth
Fictional Scottish people
Fictional nobility
Fictional murdered people
Fictional characters without a name
Fictional child deaths